In enzymology, a beta-galactoside alpha-2,6-sialyltransferase is an enzyme that catalyzes the chemical reaction

CMP-N-acetylneuraminate + beta-D-galactosyl-1,4-N-acetyl-beta-D-glucosamine  CMP + alpha-N-acetylneuraminyl-2,6-beta-D-galactosyl-1,4-N-acetyl-beta-D- glucosamine

Thus, the two substrates of this enzyme are CMP-N-acetylneuraminate and beta-D-galactosyl-1,4-N-acetyl-beta-D-glucosamine, whereas its three products are CMP, alpha-N-acetylneuraminyl-2,6-beta-D-galactosyl-1,4-N-acetyl-beta-D-, and glucosamine.

This enzyme belongs to the family of transferases, specifically those glycosyltransferases that do not transfer hexosyl or pentosyl groups. The systematic name of this enzyme class is CMP-N-acetylneuraminate:beta-D-galactosyl-1,4-N-acetyl-beta-D-glucos amine alpha-2,6-N-acetylneuraminyltransferase. This enzyme participates in n-glycan biosynthesis and glycan structures - biosynthesis 1.

References

 
 
 
 
 

EC 2.4.99
Enzymes of unknown structure